Euchelus eucastus is a species of sea snail, a marine gastropod mollusk in the family Chilodontidae.

Description
The height of the shell attains 6.5 mm.

Distribution
This species occurs in the Atlantic Ocean off Georgia, USA at a depth of 805 m.

References

 Dall W. H. (1927). Small shells from dredgings off the southeast coast of the United states by the United States Fisheries Steamer "Albatross", in 1885 and 1886. Proceedings of the United States National Museum, 70(18): 1-134

External links
 To Encyclopedia of Life
 To USNM Invertebrate Zoology Mollusca Collection
 To ITIS
 To World Register of Marine Species

eucastus
Gastropods described in 1927